Crisis? What Crisis? is the fourth album by the English rock band Supertramp, released in 1975. It was recorded in Los Angeles and London – Supertramp's first album to have recording done in the US.

A remastered CD version of the album was released on 11 June 2002 on A&M Records. The remaster features the original artwork and credits plus lyrics to all of the songs, which the original release lacked.

Record Mirror included Crisis? What Crisis? on its end-of-year list for 1975, recognising the best albums of the year.

Background and recording
Having achieved commercial success with Crime of the Century (1974), the pressure was on for Supertramp to deliver a followup, and the record company pushed them to begin work as soon as the touring for Crime of the Century was finished. While touring the west coast of North America, Supertramp unintentionally gained extra time: Hodgson injured his hand, forcing the band to cancel the rest of the tour and leaving them with nothing better to do than work on the album. Despite this, the band still had no time to rehearse for the album, and much like Indelibly Stamped (1971), songwriters Rick Davies and Roger Hodgson had no vision for a completed album worked out. Furthermore, the band's busy touring schedule had left no time for writing songs, and so they entered A&M's Los Angeles recording studios with only leftover songs from Crime of the Century (or even earlier) for material. Due to shortage of material, production had to be halted at one point so that Davies and Hodgson could write two new songs, one of which was "Ain't Nobody But Me".

Ultimate Classic Rock critic Nick DeRiso suggested that the melody of "Sister Moonshine" planted the seeds for Supertramp's later song "Give a Little Bit," which became one of their biggest hits.

Four of the songs ("Sister Moonshine", "Another Man's Woman", "Lady", and "Just a Normal Day") were performed live before the tracks were recorded and released, as documented on the BBC recorded performance of the band playing at The Hammersmith Odeon in London in March 1975 and were included on the 2001 live release Is Everybody Listening?.

Hodgson was unhappy with the album, describing it as a rushed job with none of the cohesion of Crime of the Century. Bassist Dougie Thomson concurred: "We thought that the Crisis album was a little bit disjointed and the band as a whole at that time didn't really like the album."

In the mid-1980s, however, Roger Hodgson called it his favourite Supertramp album.

Artwork
Both the title and the concept of the cover were conceived by Davies, as John Helliwell recounted: "It was Rick that came up with the name Crisis? What Crisis? and one day, when we were sitting around Scorpio Studio, he came in with this sketch of a guy in a deck chair under an umbrella with all this chaos going on around him." It appears he was inspired by Yves Robert's Alexandre le bienheureux. "Crisis? What Crisis?" is a line in the film The Day of the Jackal (1973). The phrase was used as a headline in The Sun newspaper during the Winter of Discontent in 1979 to convey a popular impression of the UK government at the time, attributed to then Prime Minister James Callaghan but denied by him. Hodgson stated that the title "came to mean more to us as a title than it did to other people because it was really a crisis album. We learnt how not to make an album, coming right off the road and going into the studio. We really didn’t enjoy making it and in the end it was kind of a patch up job." Artist Paul Wakefield returned after his work in Crime of the Century, photographing the backgrounds at the Welsh mining valleys, which were later composited with a model shot in the studio afterwards.

Critical reception

Rolling Stone panned the album in their brief review, ridiculing the lyrics in particular.

AllMusic commended the album in its retrospective review, praising Rick Davies's keyboard work, Roger Hodgson's vocals, and John Helliwell's saxophone. They especially noted the emotionally powerful songwriting, which they felt gave the album a "warm personality and charmingly subtle mood."

Track listing
All songs written by Rick Davies and Roger Hodgson.

Personnel
Supertramp
 Rick Davies – lead and backing vocals, acoustic piano (tracks 3, 5, 7, 8), Wurlitzer piano (track 7), harmonica (track 2), organ (tracks 2, 3, 6, 10), harpsichord (tracks 4, 6, 10), synthesizers (tracks 1, 2, 4, 6, 8, 9)
 Roger Hodgson – lead and backing vocals, electric guitar (tracks 1, 2, 3, 5, 6, 7, 9) 12-string guitar (tracks 1, 2, 9, 10), acoustic piano (track 4), Wurlitzer piano (track 6), flageolet (track 2), cello (track 7), pump organ (track 10), marimba (track 6), electric sitar (tracks 1, 2)
 John Anthony Helliwell – saxophones, clarinet and bass clarinet (tracks 7, 10), backing vocals (tracks 3, 6, 7, 10)
 Dougie Thomson – bass guitar
 Bob Siebenberg (credited as Bob C. Benberg) – drums, percussion

Production
 Ken Scott - producer
Supertramp - producers
Greg Calbi - remastering
Jay Messina - remastering
John Jansen - assistant
Ed Thacker - assistant
Richard Anthony Hewson - arranger
Fabio Nicoli - cover design
Paul Wakefield -  cover design
Dick Ward - cover design

2002 A&M reissue
The 2002 A&M Records reissue was mastered from the original master tapes by Greg Calbi and Jay Messina at Sterling Sound, New York, 2002. The reissue was supervised by Bill Levenson with art direction by Vartan and design by Mike Diehl, with production coordination by Beth Stempel.

Charts

Weekly charts

Year-end charts

Certifications and sales

References

Supertramp albums
1975 albums
A&M Records albums
Albums produced by Ken Scott
Albums produced by Rick Davies
Albums produced by Roger Hodgson
Albums recorded at A&M Studios